Sør-Trøndelag is one of the 19 multi-member constituencies of the Storting, the national legislature of Norway. The constituency was established in 1921 following the introduction of proportional representation for elections to the Storting. It consists of the municipalities of Åfjord, Frøya, Heim, Hitra, Holtålen, Indre Fosen, Malvik, Melhus, Midtre Gauldal, Oppdal, Orkland, Ørland, Osen, Rennebu, Rindal, Røros, Selbu, Skaun, Trondheim and Tydal in the county of Trøndelag. The constituency currently elects nine of the 169 members of the Storting using the open party-list proportional representation electoral system. At the 2021 parliamentary election it had 247,553 registered electors.

Electoral system
Sør-Trøndelag currently elects nine of the 169 members of the Storting using the open party-list proportional representation electoral system. Constituency seats are allocated by the County Electoral Committee using the Modified Sainte-Laguë method. Compensatory seats (seats at large) are calculated based on the national vote and are allocated by the National Electoral Committee using the Modified Sainte-Laguë method at the constituency level (one for each constituency). Only parties that reach the 4% national threshold compete for compensatory seats.

Election results

Summary

(Excludes compensatory seats. Figures in italics represent joint lists.)

Detailed

2020s

2021
Results of the 2021 parliamentary election held on 13 September 2021:

The following candidates were elected:
Jorodd Asphjell (Ap); Sivert Bjørnstad (FrP); Heidi Greni (Sp); Lars Haltbrekken (SV); Eva Kristin Hansen (Ap); Linda Cathrine Hofstad Helleland (H); Kirsti Leirtrø (Ap); Mari Holm Lønseth (H); Ola Borten Moe (Sp); and Hege Bae Nyholt (R).

2010s

2017
Results of the 2017 parliamentary election held on 11 September 2017:

The following candidates were elected:
Jorodd Asphjell (Ap); Sivert Bjørnstad (FrP); Trond Giske (Ap); Heidi Greni (Sp); Jon Gunnes (V); Lars Haltbrekken (SV); Eva Kristin Hansen (Ap); Linda Cathrine Hofstad Helleland (H); Kirsti Leirtrø (Ap); and Mari Holm Lønseth (H).

2013
Results of the 2013 parliamentary election held on 8 and 9 September 2013:

The following candidates were elected:
Jorodd Asphjell (Ap); Sivert Bjørnstad (FrP); Trond Giske (Ap); Heidi Greni (Sp); Eva Kristin Hansen (Ap); Linda Cathrine Hofstad Helleland (H); Frank Jenssen (H); Per Sandberg (FrP); Karianne Tung (Ap); and Snorre Valen (SV).

2000s

2009
Results of the 2009 parliamentary election held on 13 and 14 September 2009:

The following candidates were elected:
Jorodd Asphjell (Ap); Trond Giske (Ap); Gunn Karin Gjul (Ap); Øyvind Håbrekke (KrF); Eva Kristin Hansen (Ap); Linda Cathrine Hofstad Helleland (H); Tord Lien (FrP); Ola Borten Moe (Sp); Per Sandberg (FrP); and Snorre Valen (SV).

2005
Results of the 2005 parliamentary election held on 11 and 12 September 2005:

The following candidates were elected:
Jorodd Asphjell (Ap); Børge Brende (H); Øystein Djupedal (SV); Trond Giske (Ap); Gunn Karin Gjul (Ap); Eva Kristin Hansen (Ap); Ola T. Lånke (KrF); Tord Lien (FrP); Ola Borten Moe (Sp); and Per Sandberg (FrP).

2001
Results of the 2001 parliamentary election held on 9 and 10 September 2001:

The following candidates were elected:
Børge Brende (H); Øystein Djupedal (SV); Trond Giske (Ap); Gunn Karin Gjul (Ap); Ola T. Lånke (KrF); Morten Lund (Sp); Ingvild Vaggen Malvik (SV); Michael Momyr (H); Gunhild Elise Øyangen (Ap); and Christopher Stensaker (FrP).

1990s

1997
Results of the 1997 parliamentary election held on 15 September 1997:

The following candidates were elected:
Børge Brende (H); Øystein Djupedal (SV); Trond Giske (Ap); Gunn Karin Gjul (Ap); Ola T. Lånke (KrF); Morten Lund (Sp); Gunhild Elise Øyangen (Ap); Ola Røtvei (Ap); Christopher Stensaker (FrP); and Siri Frost Sterri (H).

1993
Results of the 1993 parliamentary election held on 12 and 13 September 1993:

The following candidates were elected:
Øystein Djupedal (SV); Harald Ellefsen (H); Gunn Karin Gjul (Ap); Ulf Guttormsen (Ap); Ola T. Lånke (KrF); Morten Lund (Sp); Gunhild Elise Øyangen (Ap); Ola Røtvei (Ap); Siri Frost Sterri (H); and Tove Kari Viken (Sp).

1980s

1989
Results of the 1989 parliamentary election held on 10 and 11 September 1989:

The following candidates were elected:
Harald Ellefsen (H); Kåre Gjønnes (KrF); Ulf Guttormsen (Ap); Mary Synnøve Kvidal (Ap); Gunhild Elise Øyangen (Ap); Per Risvik (FrP); Marit Rotnes (Ap); Erik Solheim (SV); Siri Frost Sterri (H); and Tove Kari Viken (Sp).

1985
Results of the 1985 parliamentary election held on 8 and 9 September 1985:

As the list alliance was entitled to more seats contesting as an alliance than it was contesting as individual parties, the distribution of seats was as list alliance votes. The KrF-DLF list alliance's additional seat was allocated to the Christian Democratic Party.

The following candidates were elected:
Liv Aasen (Ap); Jostein Berntsen (Ap); Harald Ellefsen (H); Kåre Gjønnes (KrF); Oddbjørn Hågård (Sp); Kjell Helland (Ap); Arent M. Henriksen (SV); Magnar G. Huseby (H); Marit Rotnes (Ap); and Siri Frost Sterri (H).

1981
Results of the 1981 parliamentary election held on 13 and 14 September 1981:

The following candidates were elected:
Liv Aasen (Ap); Jostein Berntsen (Ap); Hermund Eian (H); Jens P. Flå (KrF); Kjell Helland (Ap); Arent M. Henriksen (SV); Magnar G. Huseby (H); Marit Rotnes (Ap); Gunvor Margaret Schnitler (H); and Johan Syrstad (Sp).

1970s

1977
Results of the 1977 parliamentary election held on 11 and 12 September 1977:

The following candidates were elected:
Liv Aasen (Ap); Jostein Berntsen (Ap); Roald Åsmund Bye (Ap); Odd Einar Dørum (KrF-V-DNF); Hermund Eian (H); Rolf Fjeldvær (Ap); Jens P. Flå (KrF-V-DNF); Kjell Helland (Ap); Gunvor Margaret Schnitler (H); and Johan Syrstad (Sp).

1973
Results of the 1973 parliamentary election held on 9 and 10 September 1973:

The following candidates were elected:
Liv Aasen (Ap); Per Borten (Sp); Roald Åsmund Bye (Ap); Hermund Eian (H); Jens P. Flå (KrF); Rolf Fjeldvær (Ap); Kjell Helland (Ap); Arent M. Henriksen (SV); Otto Lyng (H); and Kai Øverland (SV).

1960s

1969
Results of the 1969 parliamentary election held on 7 and 8 September 1969:

The following candidates were elected:
Liv Aasen (Ap); Per Borten (Sp); Roald Åsmund Bye (Ap); Hermund Eian (H); Rolf Fjeldvær (Ap); Håkon Johnsen (Ap); Arne Kielland (Ap); Otto Lyng (H); Einar Hole Moxnes (Sp); and Kristoffer Rein (KrF).

1965
Results of the 1965 parliamentary election held on 12 and 13 September 1965:

The following candidates were elected:
Per Borten (Sp); Rolf Fjeldvær (Ap); Olav Gjærevoll (Ap); Håkon Johnsen (Ap); Otto Lyng (H); Kristoffer Rein (KrF); Martin Skaaren (H); Lars Tangvik (V); Iver Johan Unsgård (Ap); and Andreas Wormdahl (Ap).

1961
Results of the 1961 parliamentary election held on 11 September 1961:

The following candidates were elected:
Per Borten (Sp-V), 15,947 votes; Oddmund Hoel (Sp-V), 15,923 votes; Håkon Johnsen (Ap), 54,229 votes; Johan Sigurd Karlsen (Ap), 54,233 votes; Otto Lyng (H), 19,893 votes; Nils Lysø (Ap), 54,237 votes; Kristoffer Rein (KrF), 10,693 votes; Martin Skaaren (H), 19,894 votes; Iver Johan Unsgård (Ap), 54,234 votes; and Andreas Wormdahl (Ap), 54,231 votes.

1950s

1957
Results of the 1957 parliamentary election held on 7 October 1957:

The following candidates were elected:
Per Borten (Bp); Oddmund Hoel (V); Håkon Johnsen (Ap); Johan Sigurd Karlsen (Ap); Mons Arntsen Løvset (H); Otto Lyng (H); Nils Lysø (Ap); Lars Sæter (KrF); Iver Johan Unsgård (Ap); and Andreas Wormdahl (Ap).

1953
Results of the 1953 parliamentary election held on 12 October 1953:

The following candidates were elected:
Per Borten (Bp); Paul Martin Dahlø (Ap); Oddmund Hoel (V); Håkon Johnsen (Ap); Johan Sigurd Karlsen (Ap); Mons Arntsen Løvset (H); Reidar Andreas Lyseth (Ap); Lars Sæter (KrF); Amund Rasmussen Skarholt (Ap); and Harald Torp (H).

1940s

1949
Results of the 1949 parliamentary election held on 10 October 1949:

The following candidates were elected:
Per Almaas (Ap); Per Borten (Bp); Paul Martin Dahlø (Ap); Mons Arntsen Løvset (H); Amund Rasmussen Skarholt (Ap); and Ingvald Tøndel (KrF).

1945
Results of the 1945 parliamentary election held on 8 October 1945:

As the list alliance was not entitled to more seats contesting as an alliance than it was contesting as individual parties, the distribution of seats was as party votes.

The following candidates were elected:
Paul Martin Dahlø (Ap); Johan Nygaardsvold (Ap); Amund Rasmussen Skarholt (Ap); Ingvald Svinsås-Lo (V); Ingvald Tøndel (KrF); and Nils Trædal (Bp).

1930s

1936
Results of the 1936 parliamentary election held on 19 October 1936:

As the list alliance was not entitled to more seats contesting as an alliance than it was contesting as individual parties, the distribution of seats was as party votes.

The following candidates were elected:
Johan Olaus Olsen Asmundvaag (H); Martin Handberg (Bp); Johan Nygaardsvold (Ap); Kristian Ramsvik (V); Adolf Salbubæk (Ap); and Amund Rasmussen Skarholt (Ap).

1933
Results of the 1933 parliamentary election held on 16 October 1933:

As the list alliance was not entitled to more seats contesting as an alliance than it was contesting as individual parties, the distribution of seats was as party votes.

The following candidates were elected:
Johan Olaus Olsen Asmundvaag (H); Martin Handberg (Bp); Simon Leinum (V); Johan Nygaardsvold (Ap); Adolf Salbubæk (Ap); and Amund Rasmussen Skarholt (Ap).

1930
Results of the 1930 parliamentary election held on 20 October 1930:

The following candidates were elected:
Johan Olaus Olsen Asmundvaag (H); Johan Falkberget (Ap); Martin Handberg (Bp); Simon Leinum (V); Anders Nilsen Næsset (V); and Johan Nygaardsvold (Ap).

1920s

1927
Results of the 1927 parliamentary election held on 17 October 1927:

The following candidates were elected:
Martin Handberg (Bp); Peder Næsset (Bp); Johan Nygaardsvold (Ap); Svend Larsen Skaardal (Ap); Johan Sedelen Stinessen (V); and John Wolden (V).

1924
Results of the 1924 parliamentary election held on 21 October 1924:

The following candidates were elected:
Johannes Berg (H-FV); Ingebrigt Ingebrigtsen Huus (Bp); Johan Nygaardsvold (Ap); Benjamin Olsen Schei (V); Svend Larsen Skaardal (Ap); and John Wolden (V).

1921
Results of the 1921 parliamentary election held on 24 October 1921:

The following candidates were elected:
Johannes Berg (H-FV); Ingebrigt Ingebrigtsen Huus (L); Johan Nygaardsvold (Ap); Benjamin Olsen Schei (V); Svend Larsen Skaardal (Ap); and John Wolden (V).

Notes

References

Storting constituency
Storting constituencies
Storting constituencies established in 1921